"Have You Met Miss Jones?" is a popular song that was written for the musical comedy I'd Rather Be Right. The music was written by Richard Rodgers and the lyrics by Lorenz Hart. The song was published in 1937.

Background
In the musical the song is performed by characters Peggy Jones and Phil Barker. In the 1937 version these characters were played by Joy Hodges and Austin Marshall.

In movie Gentlemen Marry Brunettes (1955) sung by Rudy Vallee, Jane Russell, Jeanne Crain (dubbed by Anita Ellis), Scott Brady (dubbed by Robert Farnon) and Alan Young, Danced by Jane Russell and Jeanne Crain.

Other recordings
 Stan Getz – The Artistry of Stan Getz (1953)
 Benny Goodman with Teddy Wilson and Gene Krupa – Camel Caravan (1937)
 Tony Bennett - Tony Bennett, Stan Getz & Friends (1964)
 Ahmad Jamal – Ahmad Jamal at the Top: Poinciana Revisited (1969)
 Red Norvo with Charles Mingus and Tal Farlow – 1950
 Bing Crosby — Bing Sings Whilst Bregman Swings (1956)
 Joe Pass – Virtuoso (1973)
 George Shearing – 1947
 Art Tatum – The Art Tatum Solo Masterpieces Vol. 1 (1953)
 Frank Sinatra - Swing Along With Me (1961)
 McCoy Tyner – Reaching Fourth (1963)
 Robbie Williams – Bridget Jones's Diary (2001)

Influence
The song's bridge, featuring key motion by major thirds, may have served as an inspiration to John Coltrane in the development of "Coltrane changes".

References

See also
List of 1930s jazz standards

Songs with music by Richard Rodgers
Songs with lyrics by Lorenz Hart
1937 songs
1930s jazz standards
Jazz compositions in F major
Songs from Rodgers and Hart musicals